Several taxa of butterflies are collectively called the Sulphurs or Sulfurs:
 Coliadinae, a subfamily of butterflies commonly known as the sulphurs or yellows
 Dercas, a genus of Coliadinae commonly called the sulphurs
 Colias, a genus of Coliadinae commonly called the sulphurs (in North America) or clouded yellows (elsewhere)
 Phoebis, a genus of Coliadinae that is not itself called the sulphurs but that contains a number of species which are

Animal common name disambiguation pages